The year 585 BC was a year of the pre-Julian Roman calendar. In the Roman Empire, it was known as year 169 Ab urbe condita . The denomination 585 BC for this year has been used since the early medieval period, when the Anno Domini calendar era became the prevalent method in Europe for naming years.

Events
 28 May - Eclipse of Thales:  A solar eclipse occurs as predicted by Thales, while Alyattes of Lydia fights Cyaxares of Media at the Battle of Halys, leading to a truce. This is a cardinal date from which other dates can be calculated.
 Destruction of Kirrha, ending the First Sacred War.
 Lucius Tarquinius Priscus, fifth king of Rome, defeats the Sabines in war, taking the town of Collatia and celebrating a triumph for his victories on 13 September.
 King Jian of Zhou succeeds King Ding of Zhou as king of the Chinese Zhou Dynasty.
 Astyages succeeds Cyaxares as king of the Medes.
 Croesus succeeds Alyattes as king of Lydia.
 Fall of the Kingdom of Urartu following a Median invasion. (The Scythians ruined the Kingdom of Urartu.)

Births
 Anaximenes of Miletus, Greek philosopher (d. 528 BC)

Deaths
 April 9 (according to legend) – Emperor Jimmu,  the first Emperor of Japan (b. 711)
 Cyaxares, king of the Medes
 Alyattes, king of Lydia
 Nitocris I, Egyptian priestess
 Rusa IV, king of Urartu

References